The  is a passenger minivan that was built by the Japanese manufacturer Mazda from 1999 to 2018.

The first generation Premacy was built in Japan and exported to Europe and Asia. A rebadged version was sold by Ford in a few Asian markets (including Japan) as the Ford Ixion or Ixion MAV.

The second generation onward is sold outside Japan as the Mazda5. Ford Lio Ho in Taiwan, which assembles Mazda5 for the local market, adapted a re-badged version as the Ford i-Max from 2007 until 2011.

The first generation Premacy was a two- or three-row, five- or seven-passenger vehicle, while the second generation adds a third row of seats for up to six passengers in American form, and seven passengers outside the United States. Both generations feature near-flat floors, folding or removable second row, and fold-flat rear seats.

First generation (CP; 1999) 

The first generation Mazda Premacy was unveiled on 9 March 1999 at the Geneva Motor Show. When released in April 1999, the Mazda Premacy was one of the least expensive seven-seaters available on the market. It was available with either front or all-wheel drive and was equipped with four-speed automatic transmission. The second and third row seats could be folded and removed as on many other minivans.

This generation Premacy was also sold in some Asian markets as the Ford Ixion, from 1999 until 2003. The Taiwanese Ixion (later the Ixion MAV) was built until 2005. The first generation Premacy was also manufactured by China's FAW Haima Automobile where it is called the Haima Freema until it was replaced by the second generation Freema based on the same platform. 

It was powered by a number of engines:
 1.8 L FP-DE I4, 
 1.8 L FP-DE I4, 
 2.0 L FP-DE/FS-ZE I4, 
 2.0 L diesel I4, RF-T DI I4, 
 2.0 L diesel I4, RF-T DI I4,

Ford Ixion
The Ford Ixion is a redesign of the first generation Premacy/Mazda5, designed by Ford Lio Ho in Taiwan. Due to the fact that Mazda was controlled by Ford Lio Ho from 1998, Ford models were able to be launched at an earlier date before equivalent Mazda models were launched, and at a more competitive price with better specifications. The Taiwanese market Ford Ixion MAV features exclusively designed front and rear with Ford's design identity and was launched in Taiwan in 1999. It arrived two weeks before the local launch of the first generation Mazda Premacy. The Halo Gold color of the Premacy in the Japanese market at the time was reserved exclusively for the Ford Ixion MAV in the Taiwanese market, and features such as the Panasonic AV800 audio system, satellite navigation system, and optional reverse cameras were only offered on the Ford. However, sales of the Ford Ixion in the Taiwanese market dropped behind the Mazda Premacy starting from the second month, and sales was mediocre until discontinuation in 2005.

The Ford Ixion MAV in Taiwan is only available with a 1.8-liter 16 valve DOHC engine producing 135 hp/6200rpm and 16.5 kg-m/4500rpm mated to a 4-speed automatic transmission shared with the Ford Tierra. The MAV name means Multiple activity vehicle and is exclusive to the Taiwanese model. The Ford Ixion MAV was sold in two trim level priced at NTD 659,000 yuan and NTD 699,000 yuan.

The international version of the Ford Ixion was fitted with different grilles, bumpers and rear lights, and the styling adapted to Ford’s New Edge design theme. The model gave Ford an entry into the compact minivan market in Asia. It was built in Japan and exported to parts of Asia, and was essentially a re-badged version of the Premacy with only minor differences. It was built alongside the Premacy and was identical mechanically while sold in a few Asian markets including Japan and China. The international version of the Ford Ixion shares the two Mazda Premacy home-market engines. In 2001 the model received minor changes, with the two-row models discontinued. The whole product line was discontinued in 2003 as Ford started the global one Ford policy and ended production of its re-badged cars in Japan.

Second generation (CR; 2004)

Initial release

The second generation went on sale in 7 February 2005 in Japan and mid-2005 in export markets and was bigger than the first generation in all aspects. It was now sold as the Mazda5 in all markets except Japan. While classified by Mazda as a mid-sized wagon, it competes with other vehicles classed as Compact MPVs in Europe, and is viewed as a mini-minivan in the United States. It is based on Ford's global C1 platform, meaning it shares many parts with the Mazda3. The Mazda5 replaced the Mazda MPV as Mazda's minivan offering in most export markets.

The Mazda5's was rebranded in Asia as the Ford I-Max. This version of the vehicle was also introduced for sale in the United States, making it the first compact minivan in that market since the 1994 Mitsubishi Expo (in the United States) and 1995 Nissan Axxess (in Canada). The Mazda5 is marginally larger than the 1984–1989 Toyota Van.  Competition joined the North American minivan market in 2006 with Mercedes-Benz's B200 (in Canada and Mexico) and in 2007 Kia Motors followed suit with the 2007 Kia Rondo (in the United States and Canada).

In North America, due to safety regulations, the Mazda5 fits six passengers using three rows of seats, with two seats per row. Elsewhere, it is sold as a seven-seater using Mazda's "Karakuri Seating System", which means the car has three rows of two seats, with the seventh seat a fold away jump seat in the centre of the middle row. The Mazda5 has three-point seat belts on all seven seats.

The middle row of seats recline and slide front-to-rear, and fold flat. The rear row also folds flat.

Specifications
For the Japanese domestic market it is C model/F model –   / S model –  .

Engine options:
 1.8 L MZR I4, 85 kW (116 PS/114 hp)
 2.0 L MZR I4, 110 kW (150 PS/148 hp)
 2.3 L MZR I4, 117 or 119 kW (159–162 PS/157-159 hp)
 2.0 L MZR-CD I4 Diesel, 89 or 105 kW (105–143 PS/103-141 hp)

Recall
Mazda was forced to recall the Mazda5 in the United States shortly after production began due to a risk of exhaust system fires. Owners that were not made aware of the manual shifting mode ("sport mode") of the 4-speed automatic transmission would mistakenly leave the shifter in that position, resulting in high temperatures as the car would remain in second gear. Mazda's solution was to add a heat shield around the muffler and to alter the vehicle's software to not allow excessively high engine speeds beyond a short period of time when in "sport mode". Although the five-speed manual transmission equipped cars would seemingly not need to be recalled, Mazda chose to retrofit all Mazda5 versions with the new parts and software. The company also gave customers US$500 (for Canadian owners, it is C$500) plus a loaner car while the problem was mitigated. 2,700 vehicles were affected.

2006 model year update
For the 2006 model year, Mazda offered fewer Mazda5 options than in other markets. The North American version lacked the front-to-back roof rails that were included as standard in other markets. Other notable Mazda5 options not offered in North America included a back-up camera, power-assist side doors and even a choice of engine (2.3 L only). A second-row DVD entertainment system was eventually offered as a dealer installed add-on. Mazda produced a limited number of Mazda5 units featuring all-wheel-drive but this version was not made available outside Japan for the 2006 model year.

Mazda Premacy Hydrogen RE Hybrid (2007)

The Premacy Hydrogen RE Hybrid was a version of Mazda Premacy with a two-rotor Wankel engine supporting hydrogen or gasoline fuel.

Awards
The Mazda5 was named "Best New Multipurpose Family Vehicle" in the 2006 Canadian Car of the Year awards. Consumer Reports ranked the Mazda5 as the best "tall wagon" in their test, though the car failed to gain a "recommended" rating due to unknown reliability.

In April 2006, the Japan New Car Assessment Program (J-NCAP) awarded the Mazda5 a maximum six-star rating for front-occupant crash worthiness. In Europe, the Mazda5 was awarded a maximum five-star "adult occupant" safety rating in September 2005 by the Euro-NCAP.

2008 update
For 2008, the Mazda Premacy/Mazda5 received a mid-cycle refresh with updated front bumper, wheels and rear LED lights for Touring and Grand Touring trim levels. The automatic gearbox was updated to five-speed. The interior received a few changes to the dash including luminescent gauges, an updated radio control layout with auxiliary input, a rear A/C vent, center console, and a full set of armrests for the first and second seating rows on North American models. Mazda first released the 2008 Mazda Premacy in Japan, with other markets to follow.

2010 update
For 2010, Mazda added electronic stability control and traction control to the Mazda5, safety features that were formerly cited as oversights on the vehicle.

Ford i-Max
The Ford i-Max was developed by Ford Lio Ho in Taiwan to replace the Ford Ixion MAV that had been discontinued in 2005. Ford Lio Ho applied Ford's "Kinetic design" design language with styling changes including a redesigned front end, horizontal tail lamps, and the addition of Ford S-MAX inspired side air-vents. 

The Ford i-Max is powered by Duratec-HE 2.0 liter inline-4 gasoline engine producing 148hp/6000rpm and 19.2kgm/4500rpm mated to a sequential sport shift 4-speed automatic gearbox. The i-Max debuted in July 2007. There are four trim levels including the 5-seater GLX, 7-seater Ghia, the 7-seater Ghia-X, and the 6-seater Ghia-Limited.

A facelift was introduced in 2010 featuring an additional rear fog lamp, smoked headlamps, and red tail lamp lens.

Third generation (CW; 2010) 

The third generation was the first car to use Mazda's new Nagare design language, with the curve of the front fender flowing past the wheel well and onto the car's flank. "Nagare" means flow and was first developed for the eponymous show car of 2006.

In Europe, the new Mazda5 is offered with a 1.6-liter turbo-diesel, a 1.8-liter four-cylinder or a 2.0-liter four-cylinder gasoline engine with direct-injection and Mazda’s i-stop start/stop technology, which will reduce emissions by 15 percent. All engines include a six-speed manual transmission as standard, as well as new environmental friendly features.

For 2012, the US Mazda5 comes with a  2.5-liter four-cylinder engine. A six-speed manual transmission is standard in the base model, with a five-speed automatic optional while both the Touring and the Grand Touring come with a five-speed automatic with manual mode. The third generation began production on 13 May 2010 and began sales in Japan on 1 July 2010. The Mazda5 comes in three grades: 20CS, 20E and 20S. The base model CS does not include i-stop.

Taiwanese market models of Mazda5 were produced by Ford Lio Ho Motor Co., Ltd.

In the United States, 2015 is the last Mazda5 model year, as Mazda stopped importing the vehicle due to sluggish sales volumes. Mazda shifted its focus to crossover vehicles growing in popularity. The Mazda5 is also discontinued of European market in the same year. However, the Mazda5 continued to be sold in Canada for 2016 and 2017 model years.

2013 update
Changes to Mazda Premacy include the introduction of Skyactiv-G 2.0L engine and 6-speed Skyactiv-Drive automatic transmission. The Skyactiv variant of the Premacy will have a fuel economy of 16.2 km/L based on Japan's JC08 mode.

Japanese market models went on sale in January 2013. Early models include 20C-Skyactiv, 20S-Skyactiv, 20S-Skyactiv L-package, 20CS, 20C, 20S.

Nissan Lafesta Highway Star 

The Nissan Lafesta Highway Star is a rebranded version of the Premacy supplied to Nissan on an original equipment manufacturer (OEM) basis. It features a restyled front end. Unlike the Premacy, the new Nissan Lafesta Highway Star had flatter door panels.

Only sold in Japan, the Lafesta Highway Star went on sale on 15 June 2011.

Discontinuation 
Sales of the Premacy ended on 23 February 2018 in Japan alongside the Biante.

References

External links

Official Mazda Premacy website
What Car Review

Premacy
Euro NCAP small MPVs
Compact MPVs
Ford C1 platform
Front-wheel-drive vehicles
Minivans
2000s cars
2010s cars
Cars introduced in 1999
Plug-in hybrid vehicles